Kim Yo-jong (born 26 September 1987) is a North Korean politician and diplomat serving as the Deputy Department Director of the Publicity and Information Department of the Workers' Party of Korea, or WPK. She also served as an alternate member of the Politburo of the Workers' Party of Korea from 2017 to 2019, and again from 2020 to 2021. Since September 2021, she has also served as a member of State Affairs Commission of North Korea, the only woman on the panel.

Yo-jong is the youngest child of North Korea's second Supreme Leader Kim Jong-il and the younger sister of Kim Jong-un, the current supreme leader and WPK general secretary, and is considered by some commentators to be a possible successor.

Early life
Kim Yo-jong is the youngest child of former North Korean leader Kim Jong-il and his consort, Ko Yong-hui. The U.S. Treasury lists her birthdate as 26 September 1989, while South Korean sources place her birth on 26 September 1987. Born in Pyongyang, she spent most of her early childhood at her mother's residence, growing up alongside her siblings. Between 1996 and December 2000, Kim studied with her elder brothers at the Liebefeld-Steinhölzli public school in Bern, Switzerland, under the assumed name "Pak Mi-hyang". During this time, she is believed to have developed a close relationship with her brother and future leader, Kim Jong-un. After returning to Pyongyang, she completed a degree in computer science at Kim Il-sung University.

Political career
In 2007, Kim was appointed as a junior cadre in the ruling Workers' Party of Korea (WPK), likely working under her father or her aunt, Kim Kyong-hui. In 2009 and 2010, she was active in establishing her father's hereditary succession campaign, also working in the National Defense Commission and in her father's personal secretariat. Beginning in March 2009, she joined a group of close aides and family members that appeared at her father's side in his public appearances, but her presence was rarely noted until September 2010, when she was identified among participants at the 3rd Conference of the WPK.

Anonymous public appearances
Kim Yo-jong received much publicity during the funeral service for Kim Jong-il in December 2011, appearing alongside Kim Jong-un and leading groups of senior party officials in bowing at her father's casket. At the beginning of 2012, she was reportedly given a position at the National Defence Commission as tour manager for her brother, arranging his itineraries, schedule, logistical needs, and security arrangements. She did not appear in news reports of the time except in November 2012, when the Korean Central Television showed her accompanying Kim Jong-un and her aunt at a military riding ground.

Public recognition
Kim received her first official mention in state media in March 2014, when she accompanied her brother in voting for the Supreme People's Assembly. She was named a "senior official" of the WPK Central Committee. In October 2014, she was reported to have taken over state duties for her brother while he underwent medical treatment. The next month, she was appointed First Deputy Director of the party's Propaganda and Agitation Department.

Leadership of the Propaganda and Agitation Department
In her role as vice-director at the department, Kim is responsible for "assisting in consolidating Kim Jong-un's power" by implementing "idolisation projects". In July 2015, reports described her as playing the role of de facto leader of the department, with nominal director Kim Ki-nam in a supporting role. She also holds a vice-ministerial post, but her portfolio is not known. She regularly accompanies Kim Jong-un on his "field guidance" trips.

She has been said to be the driving force behind the development of her brother's cult of personality, modeled after that of their grandfather, Kim Il-sung. Thae Yong-ho, a North Korean defector and former diplomat, said in 2017 that Kim Yo-jong organized all major public events in North Korea. She was said to have encouraged her brother to present an image of a "man of the people" with, for example, rides on fairground attractions and his friendship with basketball star Dennis Rodman.

In January 2017, she was placed on the United States Department of the Treasury's Specially Designated Nationals List in response to human rights abuses in North Korea.

Ascension to the Politburo
In October 2017, Kim Yo-jong was made an alternate member of the Politburo, only the second woman to be appointed to this decision-making body. As previously speculated, her ascension to the country's supreme governing body may indicate that she is Kim Jong-un's replacement for his aunt, Kim Kyong-hui (with whom Kim Yo-jong is said to have a good relationship), who has not played an active role in his regime. It has also been hinted that her newly assigned position would also put her in charge of the State Security Department.

Special envoy of Kim Jong-un

On 9 February 2018, Yo-jong attended the 2018 Winter Olympics opening ceremony in Pyeongchang, South Korea. This was the first time since the Korean War that a member of the ruling Kim dynasty had visited South Korea. She met with South Korean President Moon Jae-in on 10 February and revealed that she was dispatched as a special envoy of Kim Jong-un. She also delivered a personally written letter from Kim to Moon. Kim was later part of her brother's team during the 2018 North Korea–United States Singapore Summit and the 2019 North Korea–United States Hanoi Summit. Her involvement in diplomatic affairs continued as she issued an official statement in March 2020 from her capacity as first deputy department director of the party.

According to Kim Yong-hyun, a professor of North Korean studies at Dongguk University in Seoul, and others, the promotion of Kim Yo-jong and others is a sign that "the Kim Jong-un regime has ended its coexistence with the remnants of the previous Kim Jong-il regime by carrying out a generational replacement in the party's key elite posts". Tom O'Connor of Newsweek echoed this opinion, writing that Kim Yo-jong's rise to power was part of Kim Jong-un's overall plan to appoint younger people in place of his father's older elites who may have harboured doubts about the younger Kim Jong-un's ability to lead North Korea.

Activities since 2019
Kim was elected to the Supreme People's Assembly during the 2019 North Korean parliamentary election, representing Killimgil. In April of the same year, she was briefly removed from the Politburo, before being reinstated in April 2020. She was excluded again from the Politburo elected after the 8th Party Congress and demoted from the first deputy department director to deputy department director on 10 January 2021. But some commentators and analysts say her influence in the government remains unchanged.

On 8 July 2020, Lee Kyung-jae, an attorney with the South Korean law firm Dongbuka, sued Kim for her involvement in the demolition of the Inter-Korean Liaison Office. Lee also sued Pak Jon-chong, Chief of the General Staff of the Korean People's Army. Lee added that Kim had ordered the liaison office destroyed and was "ultimately responsible" for its destruction.

In March 2021, Kim condemned virtual joint military drills held in South Korea, calling them a "serious challenge." She also warned the administration of President Joe Biden, saying, "If it wants to sleep in peace for the coming four years, it had better refrain from causing a stink at its first step." Kim threatened to decommission the Committee for the Peaceful Reunification of the Country and to shutter the Kumgangsan International Travel "and other organizations concerned as any cooperation and exchange with the South Korean authorities antagonizing us are no longer necessary." Kim also said these measures have been reported to Kim Jong-un. 

In September 2021, it was reported that Kim was promoted to be a member of the State Affairs Commission of North Korea.

In September 2022, in response to South Korean president Yoon Suk-yeol's offer to economically aid the DPRK in exchange for denuclearization, Kim made a speech before the Assembly on behalf of her brother recommending that Yoon "shut his mouth", commenting that Yoon had "nothing better to say". She additionally blamed the South for introducing COVID-19 to the country, and threatened that if the virus returned to North Korea, she would retaliate against South Korea.

Internet attention 
In April 2020, rumors of Kim Jong-un's ill health brought attention to Kim Yo-jong as a possible successor of the government's leadership in North Korea. During this period, she gained significant attention on social media including memes, informational videos and 'stanning'. In August, she gained additional attention on social media when Kim Jong-un was reported to have been in a coma.

Personal life
In late 2014, she reportedly married Choe Song, the second son of government official Choe Ryong-hae. Choe Song is thought to be a fellow alumnus of Kim Il-sung University and either an official at Room 39 of the Workers' Party of Korea (WPK) or working at a military unit responsible for guarding the country's leader. Kim Yo-jong reportedly gave birth to a child in May 2015. During the 2018 Winter Olympics, Kim was reported to have disclosed being pregnant.

See also

Kim Song-hye
Politics of North Korea
Ro Song-sil
Women in North Korea

References

External links

1987 births
Living people
Children of national leaders
Kim dynasty (North Korea)
Korean nationalists
Members of the Supreme People's Assembly
21st-century North Korean women politicians
21st-century North Korean politicians
Kim Il-sung University alumni
People from Pyongyang
North Korean propagandists
North Korean communists
Internet memes introduced in 2020
Members of the 8th Central Committee of the Workers' Party of Korea
Specially Designated Nationals and Blocked Persons List
Women government ministers of North Korea